The Wish List may refer to:
Wish list, a compilation of desired items, usually as a request for gifts
The Wish List (novel), a novel by Eoin Colfer
The Wish List (political organization), a political action committee in the U.S.
The Wish List (EP), an EP by Tinchy Stryder